Lori Dawn Crosby Little (April 5, 1963 - December 15, 1996) was the lead singer of the underground act Detente.

Following her exit from Detente, Crosby, together with producer Ross Robinson, went on to form Fear of God, which was signed to Warner Bros. Records. The band went on to record the Within the Veil album in 1991. They were slotted to become a major band in the metal music scene, even though the music was dark and dungeon-inspired. A music video for the song "Betrayed" was released. 

Following the release of this album, Crosby and the band split, and she reformed the band with new members and released a second Fear of God album titled Toxic Voodoo. The release demonstrated a heavier, thrash metal style.

Crosby died of liver failure from substance abuse on December 15, 1996.

Notes 

1963 births
American women heavy metal singers
1996 deaths
People from Oxon Hill, Maryland
20th-century American singers
20th-century American women singers
Deaths from liver failure